Mikayla Harvey (born 7 September 1998) is a New Zealand road racing cyclist, who currently rides for UCI Women's WorldTeam .

Career
Harvey joined  at the start of the 2019 season. She finished fifth overall and won the white jersey for best young rider at the 2020 Giro Rosa.

Major results

2015
 1st  Time Trial, National Junior Road Championships
2016
 Oceania Junior Continental Road Championships
1st  Time Trial
2nd Road Race
2017
 1st  Time Trial, National Under-23 Road Championships
 2nd Time Trial, Oceania Under-23 Continental Road Championships
 9th Road Race, Oceania Continental Road Championships
2018
 Oceania Under-23 Continental Road Championships
1st  Road Race
1st  Time Trial
 2nd Time Trial, National Under-23 Road Championships
2019
 1st Stage 3 (ITT) Tour de Bretagne Féminin
2020
 2nd Time Trial, National Under-23 Road Championships
 5th Overall Giro d'Italia Femminile
1st Young rider classification
 7th La Flèche Wallonne Féminine
2021 
 5th Gran Premio Ciudad de Eibar
 6th Emakumeen Nafarroako Klasikoa
2022
 9th Overall Grand Prix Elsy Jacobs

References

External links

New Zealand female cyclists
Living people
1998 births
20th-century New Zealand women
21st-century New Zealand women